A by-election was held for the New South Wales Legislative Assembly electorate of East Sydney on 20 January 1860 because Charles Cowper had resigned from parliament on 26 October 1859, but was re-elected at the resulting by-election, having been nominated without his consent.

Dates

Candidates

 Peter Faucett was a barrister and former member of the Legislative Assembly. He had received the most votes of the unsuccessful candidates at the 1859 East Sydney by-election.

 Robert Stewart was cabinetmaker and undertaking who was nominated by the Reverend John Lang. He had received the most votes of the unsuccessful candidates at the 1859 West Sydney election.

 John West was the conservative editor of the Sydney Morning Herald. Antony Green described his nomination as a joke on the hustings. The Empire gave a detailed account of the nomination of Reverend West, while the Sydney Morning Herald reported that the nominator had spoken in a "facetious strain for some minutes".

Result

Charles Cowper resigned for a second time, having been nominated without his consent.

See also
Electoral results for the district of East Sydney
List of New South Wales state by-elections

References

1860 elections in Australia
New South Wales state by-elections
1860s in New South Wales